Jacka may refer to:
 Jacka, Australian Capital Territory, a suburb of Canberra, Australia
 The Jacka (1977–2015), American rapper
 Albert Jacka (1893–1932), Australian army captain
 Benedict Jacka (born 1980), British writer
 Beryl Elaine Jacka (1913–1989), Australian administrator
 David Jacka (born 1968), Australian aviator and activist

See also 
 Jacka Glacier, on Heard Island in the Indian Ocean
 Jaca (disambiguation)
 Jaka